Margun is a village in the Batken Region of Kyrgyzstan. It is part of the Leylek District. Its population was 3,208 in 2021. Nearby towns and villages include Churbek (4 miles) and Katrang (13 miles).

External links 
Satellite map at Maplandia.com

References

Populated places in Batken Region